Marionia elongoreticulata is a species of sea slug, a dendronotid nudibranch, a marine gastropod mollusc in the family Tritoniidae.

Distribution
This species was described from North Najata (Nyata) Island, Banda Sea, Indonesia with additional specimens from Culebra Island in the Verde Island Passage, Philippines, . It has been reported from Pulau Sangeang, Indonesia.

References

Tritoniidae
Gastropods described in 2007